The following is a list of the television networks and announcers who have broadcast the college football's Conference USA Championship Game throughout the years.

Television

Radio

References 

Broadcasters
ABC Sports
Conference USA
ESPN2
Lists of college football broadcasters